Anders Warming (born 1972) is a Danish automotive designer who is the future Director of Design at Rolls-Royce. He started his new job in July 2021.
Formerly he has been the Chief Design Officer of Borgward. He was the chief of Design for the Mini division of BMW, but resigned in July 2016. Many 1st and 2nd Generation Mini owners disliked his styling approach for the third generation cars. The most often criticized design element was the front end, something many people called a 'fish mouth' due to its large oval grille and lip-like black plastic trim. Before working at MINI, he was the chief of exterior design for BMW from 2007 to the end of 2010. After leaving MINI, he joined Borgward and later started his own design firm. In 2020, he was invited to draw Hengchi 1,2 and 4, which the cars going to be produced next year. Hengchi is the brand of China Evergrande New Energy Vehicle Group Limited (a subsidiary of Evergrande Group)

Biography

Education and early career 
Warming studied at Art Centre College of Design Europe, Vevey, Switzerland and also the campus in Pasadena, California. He began his career at the BMW's DesignworksUSA studio in California in 1997.

Warming also had a short tenure at Volkswagen from 2003 to 2005.

He worked at various positions before returning to BMW headquarters in Munich in 2005.

Career 
Warming contributed to the exterior designs of the new second generation iteration of the BMW X3. He also was known for his designs on the new BMW 5 series, Z4, and the new 6 series.

He has worked under Chris Bangle when he was the chief of BMW car design and also worked under Bangle's successor Adrian van Hooydonk. In spring of 2011 Anders Warming became the Chief of Design at BMW Mini.

He then joined Borgward as Chief Design Officer.

As of May 2019, Anders Warming founded his own design studio, Warming Design, based in Munich, Germany.
In 2021 he was appointed as the Director of Design at Rolls-Royce [starting July 2021].

References

External links 
 BMW Designers  Anders Warming on an overview of automotive designers working for BMW.
https://warming-design.com - Warming Design

1972 births
Living people
BMW designers
Danish expatriates in Germany
Art Center College of Design alumni